Two Men is a Canadian television film, directed by Gordon Pinsent and broadcast by CBC Television in 1988. The film stars John Vernon as Alex Koves, a Hungarian Jewish Holocaust survivor living in Toronto, Ontario, who discovers that Michael Barna (Jan Rubeš), the Nazi officer responsible for the death of most of Koves' family at Auschwitz, is also living in the city as a successful and respected businessman.

The cast also includes Martha Gibson, Patricia Collins and Lila Kedrova.

The film aired on November 20, 1988.

Awards and nominations

References

External links

1988 films
1988 television films
English-language Canadian films
CBC Television original films
Jewish Canadian films
Canadian drama television films
1980s Canadian films